Stacy Ladell Robinson (February 19, 1962 – May 8, 2012) was a professional American football wide receiver in the National Football League (NFL) for the New York Giants.

Robinson's most notable game was in week 13 of the 1986 season, when the Giants were playing the 49ers on Monday Night Football. The Giants trailed 17-0 at halftime, but scored three touchdowns in the third quarter to win the game. Robinson caught the second touchdown, a 34-yard pass from Phil Simms, but he made an incredible grab on a 49-yard pass from Phil Simms, down to the 1-yard line, to set up the Giants' final score. He finished with 5 catches for a career-high 116 yards receiving as the Giants won 21-17. The Giants went on to win Super Bowl XXI that season over the Denver Broncos, and Robinson caught three passes for a team high 62 receiving yards in the big game.

Death
Robinson died of Multiple myeloma.

See also
History of the New York Giants (1979–1993)

References

1962 births
2012 deaths
Players of American football from Saint Paul, Minnesota
American football wide receivers
Prairie View A&M Panthers football players
North Dakota State Bison football players
New York Giants players
Place of death missing
Deaths from multiple myeloma